

Classification 

The winning roster of Proleter Zrenjanin:
  Vilmos Lóczi
  Dušan Radojčić
  Ljubomir Katić
  Milutin Minja
  Lajos Engler
  Aleksandar Tornjanski
  Ferenc Kurc
  Laslo Rošival
  Đura Bjeliš
  Branimir Lipovčević
  Ante Šeparević
  Jovan Kifer
  Pavle Skorobrin
  Miroslav Mirosavljević
  Lajoš Šifliš

Coach:  Vojislav Stankov

References

Yugoslav First Basketball League seasons